Remedy, Remedies, The Remedy or Remediation may refer to:

Computing and gaming
 Remedy Corp, an American software company
 Remedy Entertainment, a Finnish video game developer

Law, politics, and society
 Environmental remediation, the removal of pollution or contaminants from the environment
 Legal remedy, an action by a court of law to impose its will
 Remedial education, the act or process of correcting a fault or resolving a deficiency: e.g., remediation of a learning disability
 Remediation (Marxist theory), a theory of media proposed by Jay David Bolter and Richard Grusin
 Remedy UK, a defunct pressure group representing junior doctors

Medicine
 Cure, a medical treatment that ends an illness or condition
 Home remedy, a treatment that employs common items from the home
 Panacea (medicine), a medical cure-all or, metaphorically, a solution to all problems
 Pharmaceutical drug, any chemical substance intended for use in medical treatment
 Therapy, the attempted remediation of a health problem

Film and television
 Remedy (film), a 2005 American crime drama
 Remedy (2009 film), a short film by Karl T. Hirsch
 Remedy (TV series), a 2014 Canadian medical drama

Music 
 The Remedies (active 1997-2000s), a Nigerian hiphop music group
 Remedy (rapper) (born 1972), Ross Filler, a member of the Wu-Tang Clan
 Remedy Records (Germany), a heavy metal label whose roster has included Soul Demise
 Remedy Records, a UK label that issues the albums of Dominic Brown

Albums
 Remedy (Basement Jaxx album), 1999
 Remedy (David Crowder Band album) or the title song, 2007
 Remedy (Old Crow Medicine Show album), 2014
 Remedy (The Red One), by Remedy Drive, 2001
 Remedy: A Live Album, by Remedy Drive, 2003
 The Remedy (Boyz II Men album), 2006
 The Remedy (Jagged Edge album), 2011
 The Remedy (Karima Francis album), 2012
 The Remedy (Kurt Rosenwinkel album), 2008
 The Remedy (Native Deen album), 2011
 The Remedy, an unreleased album by Rell, 2001
 Remedies (Dr. John album), 1970
 Remedies (The Herbaliser album), 1995

Songs
 "Remedy" (Alesso song), 2018
 "Remedy" (The Black Crowes song), 1992
 "Remedy" (Crookers song), 2010
 "Remedy" (Little Boots song), 2009
 "Remedy" (Professor Green song), 2011
 "Remedy" (Seether song), 2005
 "The Remedy (I Won't Worry)", by Jason Mraz, 2002
 "Remedy", by 30 Seconds to Mars from America, 2018
 "Remedy", by Adele from 25, 2015
 "Remedy", by the Band from High on the Hog, 1996
 "Remedy", by Cold from Year of the Spider, 2003
 "Remedy", by Disciple from Horseshoes & Handgrenades, 2010
 "Remedy", by Laura Mvula from Pink Noise, 2021
 "Remedy", by Maroon 5 from Jordi, 2021
 "Remedy", by Snoop Lion from Reincarnated, 2010
 "Remedy", by Zac Brown Band from Jekyll + Hyde, 2015
 "The Remedy", by Abandoned Pools from Humanistic, 2001
 "The Remedy", by Puscifer from Money Shot, 2015

See also